Luiz Fernando Pecorari Baricelli (São Paulo, 14 July 1971) is a Brazilian actor and presenter He became known in 1991 as Dom Diogo in the extinct TV Manchete in the series O Guarani. On 24 April 1995 he was nationally known as Romão in the first, second, third and fifth seasons of Malhação (1995–1999). He played Fred in Laços de Família (2000) alongside Giovanna Antonelli. Over the years, he has played numerous characters such as Raul in Alma Gêmea (2005), Alexandre Paixão in Sabor da Paixão (2002), and Flávio in O Profeta (2006).

In 2008 he began his career as a presenter at his own skit on Domingão do Faustão, which ended in 2009. From 2009 to 2010 he presented Vídeo Show with André Marques. Baricelli made his last character at Globo as Oscar in Insensato Coração (2011).

In 2016 Baricelli left Rede Globo and worked on two reality shows, Escola Para Maridos (2016) by Fox and À Primeira Vista (2017) of Band

Filmography

Television

Cinema

References 

1971 births
Living people
Brazilian telenovela actors
20th-century Brazilian male actors
21st-century Brazilian male actors
Male actors from São Paulo